Marshland is a 2014 Spanish thriller film directed by Alberto Rodríguez which stars Javier Gutiérrez and Raúl Arévalo. The film was presented at the 62nd San Sebastián International Film Festival on 20 September 2014. It swept the 29th Goya Awards, winning ten categories, including Best Film, Director, Original Screenplay, and Leading Actor (Gutiérrez).

Plot
In 1980, Madrid homicide detectives Pedro Suárez and Juan Robles are sent to a "backwater" town on the Guadalquivir Marshes in Spain's "Deep South" to investigate the disappearance of two teenage sisters (Carmen and Estrella) during the town's festivities. Pedro, openly critical of Spain's past during the Francoist Dictatorship, has a problem with authority figures, while Juan seems not to care, though he has a troubled past of his own.

The detectives meet with the girls' father, Rodrigo, a local riverboat skipper. Although Rodrigo and his wife Rocío say that their daughters were average girls, the duo hear from the local police that they were known for their promiscuity, and from their friends that they had a deep urge to leave the town. Rocío also gives the detectives a burnt film reel she has found, depicting the girls naked and in bed with a man whose face is obscured by a flash. Soon enough, both Carmen and Estrella are found dead and dumped in the local marsh, having been raped and tortured to death.

Troubled and with no leads, the two detectives attempt to spy on Quini, the handsome and suave former boyfriend of Carmen. Quini, now dating another town girl, Marina, manages to sneak up on the detectives after they have followed him and attempts to threaten them with a knife. After disarming and sending him away, the two agree that Quini must be part of whatever is occurring. The problem proves to be even bigger after a drunk man named Castro tells the detectives about a similar case: his girlfriend, Beatriz, was close to Quini and the sisters, and was found dismembered in the marshes, her suitcase floating there.

Pedro and Juan continue to investigate, gradually unravelling secrets. It is revealed that the riverboats and marshes are being used to smuggle and transport heroin, and that Rodrigo had stolen a kilo and sold it, getting him in trouble with the locals. However, the locals involved in the drugs seek out the detectives, revealing their participation in drug smuggling in full but claiming they had nothing to do with the sisters' deaths. One of the men does aid the investigation, however, by describing a white Dyane 6 he saw at the church where one of the girls' purse was found. After digging through more victims' items, the two see a pattern of out-of-town job brochures for women, eventually linking Quini to a man named Sebastián. Digging through Sebastián's past, they find a warrant out for him for the possible sexual molestation of a child, solidifying his chance of being the main culprit. Juan and Pedro deduce that Quini and Sebastián were luring the young women of the town, who were aching to leave and find their own independence through work, by passing these brochures around and then entrapping them into sexual slavery at a local hunting lodge.

Waters grow murky, however, when Pedro becomes aware of Juan's past shooting of a girl at a protest during the Franco Era. Pedro is also angered after a possible third culprit, a local factory owner named Alfonso Corrales, is brushed over, most likely due to complex political ties. The two continue on, though, eventually deducing Sebastián's cover as the watchman of the hunting lodge. Pedro attempts to follow and observe Sebastián's white Dyane 6, but loses him. With the help of a local poacher named Jesús, the trio finally chases Sebastián into the marshes. All three are shot by the sniping Sebastián, though as he is about to slay Pedro, Juan is able to sneak up and stab him, which he does repeatedly, in a state. After Sebastián falls dead into the swamp, Juan opens the trunk of the car to rescue a bruised but still alive Marina.

The town is brought peace after the case is solved, as well as by the local worker's union accepting a pay raise (which in principle, they felt was too low). All seems well for the detectives, too, as Pedro sees a promotion and relocation closer to his own home and wife. On the final night of their stay, however, Pedro receives photographs from a journalist who has helped on the case. Though Juan justified his shooting story by saying it was his former partner's actions, the journalist reveals that he had in fact been a brutal officer in Franco's notorious secret police, and to have once been known as "The Crow".

In the morning, before they drive home, Juan asks a stoney-faced Pedro if they "are good". Pedro does not answer, and the two ride off to an uncertain future.

Cast

Critical reception
The film received mostly positive reviews. It has a critic approval rating of 92% on the review aggregator Rotten Tomatoes, with an average rating of 7.72/10, based on 36 reviews. The website's critics consensus reads: "As narratively taut as it is richly atmospheric, Marshland keeps viewers guessing throughout a procedural thriller with surprising nuance." Critics have hailed Marshland as one of the best Spanish films of 2014, and have defined it as a suffocating cop thriller with a subtle sociopolitical subplot. They have also pointed out reminiscences of American series True Detective in the star power of the main actors and the environment of the film, although the film began to be recorded before the series' release. Jay Weissberg of Variety deemed the film to be "a satisfyingly atmospheric neo-noir", even if it ultimately disappoints in its denouement, leaving many questions unanswered.

Accolades

|-
| align = "center" rowspan = "4" | 2014 || rowspan=4 | 62nd San Sebastián International Film Festival
| colspan=2 | Golden Shell for Best Film
|  || rowspan = "4" | 
|-
| Silver Shell for Best Actor
| Javier Gutiérrez
| 
|-
| Best Cinematography
| Álex Catalán
| 
|-
| colspan=2 | I Premio Feroz Zinemaldia
| 
|-
| align = "center" rowspan = "39" | 2015 || rowspan = "3" | 20th Forqué Awards || colspan = "2" | Best Fiction Picture ||  || rowspan = "3" | 
|-
| rowspan = "2" | Best Actor || Javier Gutiérrez || 
|-
| Raúl Arévalo || 
|-
| rowspan=10 | 2nd Feroz Awards
| colspan=2 | Best Drama
|  || rowspan = "10" | 
|-
| Best Director
| Alberto Rodríguez
| 
|-
| Best Screenplay
| Alberto Rodríguez & Rafael Cobos
| 
|-
| rowspan=2 | Best Main Actor
| Raúl Arévalo
| 
|-
| Javier Gutiérrez
| 
|-
| Best Supporting Actor
| Antonio de la Torre
| 
|-
| Best Supporting Actress
| Nerea Barros
| 
|-
| Best Original Soundtrack
| Julio de la Rosa
| 
|-
| colspan=2 | Best Trailer
| 
|-
| colspan=2 | Best Film Poster
| 
|-
| rowspan=17 | 29th Goya Awards
| colspan=2 | Best Film
| 
| rowspan = "17" | 
|-
| Best Director
| Alberto Rodríguez
| 
|-
| Best Original Screenplay
| Rafael Cobos and Alberto Rodríguez
| 
|-
| rowspan=2 | Best Main Actor
| Raúl Arévalo
| 
|-
| Javier Gutiérrez
| 
|-
| Best Supporting Actor
| Antonio de la Torre
| 
|-
| Best Supporting Actress
| Mercedes León
| 
|-
| Best New Actress
| Nerea Barros
| 
|-
| Best Original Score
| Julio de la Rosa
| 
|-
| Best Cinematography
| Álex Catalán
| 
|-
| Best Editing
| José M. G. Moyano
| 
|-
| Best Production Supervision
| Manuela Ocón
| 
|-
| Best Art Direction
| Pepe Domínguez
| 
|-
| Best Costume Design
| Fernando García
| 
|-
| Best Makeup and Hairstyles
| Yolanda Piña
| 
|-
| Best Sound
| Daniel de Zayas, Nacho Royo-Villanova and Pelayo Gutiérrez
| 
|-
| Best Special Effects
| Pedro Moreno and Juan Ventura
| 
|-
| rowspan = "5" | 24th Actors and Actresses Union Awards || rowspan = "2" | Best Film Actor in a Leading Role || Javier Gutiérrez ||  || rowspan = "5" | 
|-
| Raúl Arévalo || 
|-
| Best Film Actress in a Minor Role || Mercedes León || 
|-
| rowspan = "2" | Best Film Actor in a Minor Role || Manolo Solo || 
|-
| Antonio de la Torre || 
|-
| 57th Ariel Awards || colspan = "2" | Best Ibero-American Film ||  || 
|-
| 2nd Platino Awards || colspan = "2" | Best Ibero-American Film ||  || 
|-
| Neox Fan Awards 2015
| colspan=2 | Best Spanish film
| 
| 
|-
| 28th European Film Awards
| colspan=2 | European Film Academy People's Choice Award for Best European Film
| 
| 
|}

See also 
 List of Spanish films of 2014

Bibliography
El cine de Alberto Rodríguez. Conversaciones, de Manuel Lamarca, Ediciones Carena, Barcelona, 2020, .

References

External links
 
 
 

Films set in 1980
European Film Awards winners (films)
2010s mystery thriller films
2010s serial killer films
Spanish mystery thriller films
Films set in Andalusia
Films directed by Alberto Rodríguez Librero
Atípica Films films
Sacromonte Films films
2010s Spanish films
2010s Spanish-language films
Films about the Spanish Transition
Atresmedia Cine films
Spanish neo-noir films